Swedish Americans are Americans of Swedish ancestry. They include the 1.2 million Swedish immigrants during 1865–1915, who formed tight-knit communities, as well as their descendants and more recent immigrants.

Today, Swedish Americans are found throughout the United States, with Minnesota, California, and Illinois being the three states with the highest number of Swedish Americans. Historically, newly arrived Swedish immigrants settled in the Midwest, namely Minnesota, the Dakotas, Iowa, and Wisconsin, just as other Scandinavian Americans. Populations also grew in the Pacific Northwest in the states of Oregon and Washington at the turn of the twentieth century.

Migration

Colonial

The first Swedish Americans were the settlers of New Sweden: a colony established by Queen Christina of Sweden in 1638. It centered around the Delaware Valley including parts of the present-day states of Delaware, New Jersey, and Pennsylvania. New Sweden was incorporated into New Netherland in 1655, and ceased to be an official territory of the Realm of Sweden. However, many Swedish and Finnish colonists remained and were allowed some political and cultural autonomy.

A victim of one of the earliest recorded murders in North America was an immigrant from Sweden. In 1665, in Brooklyn, New York, Barent Jansen Blom, progenitor of the Blom/Bloom family of Brooklyn and the lower Hudson Valley, was stabbed to death by Albert Cornelis Wantenaer.

Present day reminders of the history of New Sweden are reflected in the presence of the American Swedish Historical Museum in Philadelphia, Fort Christina State Park in Wilmington, Delaware, Governor Printz Park, and  the Printzhof in Essington, Pennsylvania.

Midwest

Swedish emigration to the United States had reached new heights in 1896, and it was in this year that the Vasa Order of America, a Swedish American fraternal organization, was founded to help immigrants, who often lacked an adequate network of social services. Swedish Americans usually came through New York City and subsequently settled in the upper Midwest. Most were Lutheran and belonged to synods now associated with the Evangelical Lutheran Church in America, including the Augustana Evangelical Lutheran Church. Theologically, they were pietistic; politically they often supported progressive causes and prohibition.

In the year 1900, Chicago was the city with the second highest number of Swedes after Stockholm, the capital of Sweden. By then, Swedes in Chicago had founded the Evangelical Covenant Church and established such enduring institutions as Swedish Covenant Hospital and North Park University. Many others settled in Minnesota in particular, followed by Wisconsin; as well as New York, Pennsylvania, Michigan, Iowa, Nebraska, Kansas and Illinois. Like their Norwegian American and Danish American brethren, many Swedes sought out the agrarian lifestyle they had left behind in Sweden, as many immigrants settled on farms throughout the Midwest.  There are towns scattered throughout the Midwest, such as Lindsborg, Kansas and Lindström, Minnesota, that to this day continue to celebrate their Swedish heritage.

New York and Pennsylvania
The port of New York, imports of Swedish iron, and the prevalence of Swedish mariners factored in making New York City the principal port of entry for Swedish immigrants. Swedes have been persistent during the long history of New York City, but have never been a major immigrant group in the metropolitan region. The place name for the Bronx has its origins in the early settler Jonas Bronck, who was part of the New Netherland colony in 1639 and likely of Swedish origin. A Swedish neighborhood along Atlantic Avenue in Brooklyn developed beginning in the 1850s.

An early community of Swedish immigrants (1848) became established in northwestern Pennsylvania and western New York stemming from the port of Buffalo connecting the Erie Canal with the Great Lakes. Jamestown, New York, became a principal Swedish American city during the peak of Swedish immigration. The Swedish American community in this area often served as a stepping stone for immigrants who settled in the Midwest, especially early communities in Illinois and Minnesota, as well as Massachusetts.

New England

In the east, New England became a destination for many skilled industrial workers and Swedish centers developed in areas such as Jamestown, New York; Providence, Rhode Island, and Boston. A small Swedish settlement was also started in New Sweden, Maine. 51 Swedish settlers came to the wooded area, led by W. W. Thomas, who called them  ('my children in the woods'). Upon arrival, they knelt in prayer and gave thanks to God. This area soon expanded and other settlements were named Stockholm, Jemtland, and Westmanland, in honor of their Swedish heritage. (Stockholm is the capital of Sweden, while Jämtland and Västmanland are Swedish provinces.)

The town of New Sweden, Maine, celebrates St. Lucia, Midsummer, and Founders Day (July 23). It is a Swedish American community that continues to honor traditions of the old country. Gustaf Adolph Lutheran Church was served by a native of Sweden as recently as 1979–1985 (The Rev. Hans Olof Andræ, born 1933 in Vimmerby, Sweden) who was known to occasionally conduct special worship services in Swedish.

The largest settlement in New England was Worcester, Massachusetts. Here, Swedes were drawn to the city's wire and abrasive industries. By the early 20th century numerous churches, organizations, businesses, and benevolent associations had been organized – among them, the Swedish Cemetery Corporation (1885), the Swedish Lutheran Old People's Home (1920), Fairlawn Hospital (1921), and the Scandinavian Athletic Club (1923). These institutions survive today, although some have mainstreamed their names.

Numerous local lodges of national Swedish American organizations also flourished and a few remain solvent as of 2008. Within the city's largest historic "Swedish" neighborhood—Quinsigamond Village—street signs read like a map of Sweden: Stockholm Street, Halmstad Street, and Malmo Street among others. Worcester's Swedes were historically staunch Republicans and this political loyalty is behind why Worcester remained a Republican stronghold in an otherwise Democratic state well into the 1950s.

West Coast
Many Swedes also came to the Pacific Northwest during the turn of the 20th century, along with Norwegians and Finns, settling in Washington and Oregon. According to research by the Oregon Historical Society, Swedish immigrants "felt a kinship with the natural surroundings and economic opportunities in the Pacific Northwest," and the region experienced a significant influx of Swedish and Scandinavian immigrants between 1890 and 1910.

Notable influence can be felt in the neighborhood of Ballard in Seattle, Washington, and by the Swedish Medical Center, a major hospital also in Seattle. In Oregon, Swedish immigrant populations were concentrated in the rural areas east of Portland, and a significant Swedish community was also established in the coastal city of Astoria along with Finnish and Norwegian settlers who worked in the timber and fishing industries.

Assimilation
In the 1860–1890 era, there was little assimilation into American society. The Swedish Americans attached relatively little significance to the American dimension of their ethnicity; instead they relied on an extant Swedish literature. There was a relatively weak Swedish American institutional structure before 1890, and Swedish Americans were somewhat insecure in their social-economic status in America.

An increasingly large Swedish American community fostered the growth of an institutional structure—a Swedish-language press, churches and colleges, and ethnic organizations—that placed a premium on sponsoring a sense of Swedishness in the United States. Blanck (2006) argues that after 1890 there emerged a self-confident Americanized generation. At prestigious Augustana College, for example, American-born students began to predominate after 1890. The students mostly had white-collar or professional backgrounds; few were the sons and daughters of farmers and laborers.

These students developed an idealized view of Sweden, characterized by romanticism, patriotism, and idealism, just like their counterparts across the Atlantic. The new generation was especially proud of the Swedish contributions to American democracy and the creation of a republic that promised liberty and destroyed the menace of slavery. A key spokesman was Johan Alfred Enander, longtime editor of Hemlandet (Swedish for 'The Homeland'), the Swedish newspaper in Chicago. Enander argued that the Vikings were instrumental in enabling the "freedom" that spread not only throughout the British Isles, but America as well.

Swedes, moreover, were among the first founders of America with their New Sweden colony in Delaware. Swedish America was present in Congress under the Articles of Confederation period, and its role was momentous in fighting the war against slavery. As a paragon of freedom and the struggle against unfreedom, and as an exemplar of the courage of the Vikings in contrast to the Catholic Columbus, Swedish America could use its culture to stress its position as loyal adherents to the larger Protestant American society.

In 1896 the Vasa Order of America, a Swedish-American fraternal organization, was founded to provide ethnic identity and social services such as health insurance and death subsidies, operates numerous social and recreational opportunities, and maintains contact with fellow lodges in Sweden. Johannes and Helga Hoving were its leaders, calling for the maintenance of the Swedish language and culture among Swedish Americans, especially the younger generation. However, they returned to Sweden in 1934 and Vasa itself became Americanized.

Literature 
As a highly literate population, their output of print media was even more remarkable, and cultural leadership was exerted by numerous magazine and newspaper editors more so than by churchmen. The Swedish American press was the second largest foreign-language press in the United States (after German language imprints) in 1910.   By 1910 about 1200 Swedish periodicals had been started in several states.  Valkyrian, a magazine based in New York City, helped fashion a distinct Swedish American culture between 1897 and 1909. Valkyrian helped strengthen ethnicity by drawing on collective memory and religion, mythicizing Swedish and Swedish American history, describing American history, politics, and current events in a matter-of-fact way, publishing Swedish American literature, and presenting articles on science, technology, and industry in the United States.

The community produced numerous writers and journalists, of whom the most famous was poet-historian Carl Sandburg from Illinois.  The harsh experiences of the frontier were subjects for novelists and story tellers, Of interest revealing the immigrant experience are the novels of Lillian Budd (1897–1989), especially April Snow (1951), Land of Strangers (1953), and April Harvest (1959). Swedish author Vilhelm Moberg wrote a series of four books about a group of Swedish-American emigrants, starting with The Emigrants (1949), which were translated in the 1950s and 1960s. They were also filmed by Jan Troell as The Emigrants and The New Land.

Socioeconomic mobility 
Baigent (2000) explores the dynamics of economic and cultural assimilation and the "American Dream" in one small city. Most Swedes in McKeesport, Pennsylvania, between 1880 and 1920 were permanent settlers rather than temporary migrants. Many ended up comfortably off and a few became prosperous. They judged their success against Swedes in Sweden, not McKeesporters of other nationalities. They had no illusions about American life but they chose to stay and confront difficult living and working conditions rather than move on or return to Sweden where good jobs were scarce and paid much less.

Many of their children were upwardly socially mobile, and America offered girls in particular greater opportunities than Sweden did. The immigrants greatly valued the religious freedom that America offered, but their political freedoms were heavily circumscribed by McKeesport's "booze interest" and iron and steel bosses. Swedes dominated the prohibition movement in the town, but this did not open the door to a wider political stage. The dreams of many individual Swedes came true, but the dream of creating a permanent Swedish community in McKeesport was not realized, since individual Swedes moved on within the United States in pursuit of continued economic success.  Swedish Americans formed their own social identity within the U.S. during the period through their memberships of social clubs and their deliberate membership or non-membership in different ethnically based institutions.

The story of A. V. Swanson, who in 1911 left Bjuv at age 20 and settled in Ames, Iowa, eight years later is a case study in farming and business success.

Working-class Swedes 
The Swedish group was, as many other emigrant groups, highly differentiated. There still is a lot of research waiting to be done on the more urban and working-class parts of the Swedish immigrant group, where some ended up in slums like Swede Hollow in St. Paul, Minnesota, which had a population of about roughly 1,000 squatters around 1890 (slightly less in 1900, according to the census carried out that year). Child mortality was high and diphtheria and pertussis common. Many also died in work-related accidents. Drunkenness and wife beatings were also common.

Swedish housemaids were in high demand in America. Working conditions were far better than in Sweden, in terms of wages, hours of work, benefits, and ability to change positions.

Stereotypes 
During the first waves of migration the Swedes were also subjected to certain stereotypes and prejudices. The expression "dumb Swede" was established as they had difficulty learning English. There were entertainment shows which used a character called "John Johnsson" when poking fun at Swedes. He was dumb, clumsy, drank too much and talked with a funny accent. Many also complained about the smell of the Swedes that was considered to smell fishy like herrings. In 1901 Horace Glenn wrote, "Walking behind a string of Swedes is impossible to a person with delicate nose. It's an odor which could only come from generations of unwashed ancestors."

Swedish Americans opposed entry into World War I, in which Sweden was neutral. Political pressures during the war encouraged a rapid switch from Swedish to English in church services—the older generation was bilingual by now and the youth could hardly understand the old language. Swedish language newspapers lost circulation. Most communities typically switched to English by 1920.

By the 1930s, assimilation into American life styles was almost complete, with few experiences of hostility or discrimination.

Preserving Swedish cultural heritage (1940–present) 

After 1940, the Swedish language was rarely taught in high schools or colleges, and Swedish-language newspapers or magazines nearly all closed. A few small towns in the U.S. have retained a few distinctive characteristics. For example Silverhill, Alabama; Lindstrom, Minnesota; Karlstad, Minnesota; Gothenburg, Nebraska; Andover, Illinois; Kingsburg, California; and Bishop Hill, Illinois.

Lindsborg, Kansas, is representative. It was founded by Lutheran pietists in 1869 on land purchased from the Kansas Pacific Railroad; the First Swedish Agricultural Company of Chicago spearheaded the colonization. Known today as Little Sweden, Lindsborg is the economic and spiritual center of the Smoky Valley.

The rise of agribusiness, the decline of the family farm, the arrival of nearby discount stores, and the "economic bypass" of the new interstate system wrought economic havoc on this community. By the 1970s Lindsborg residents pulled together a unique combination of musical, artistic, intellectual, and ethnic strengths to reinvent their town. The Sandzén Gallery, Runbeck Mill, Swedish Pavilion, historical museum at Bethany College, and Messiah Festival were among the activities and attractions used to enhance the Swedish image. The Lindsborg plan is representative of growing national interest in ethnic heritage, historic preservation, and small-town nostalgia in the late 20th century.

Organizations preserving Swedish culture
 American Swedish Historical Museum, Philadelphia, PA
 American Swedish Institute, Minneapolis, MN
 Concordia Language Villages (Swedish Language Camp)
 Gustavus Adolphus College, St. Peter, MN
 Nordstjernan (newspaper), New York, NY
 North Park University, Chicago, IL
 Scandinavian American Cultural and Historical Foundation (SACHF), Thousand Oaks, CA
 Scandinavian Heritage Foundation, Portland, OR
 Swedish-American Chamber of Commerce (SACC), New York
 Swedish American Chamber of Commerce (SACC), Washington, DC
 Swedish American Hospital, Rockford, IL
 Swedish American Museum Andersonville, Chicago, IL
 Swedish Council of America (SCA), Minneapolis, MN
 Swedish Covenant Hospital, Chicago, IL
 Swedish Women's Educational Association (SWEA)
 The American-Scandinavian Foundation, New York, NY
 Vasa National Archives, Bishop Hill, IL
 Vasa Order of America

Cities preserving Swedish culture
 Bishop Hill, IL
 Center City, MN
 Chicago, IL
 Chisago City, MN
 Geneva, IL
 Jamestown, NY
 Kingsburg, CA
 Lindsborg, KS
 Lindström, MN
 Mount Jewett, PA
 New Sweden, ME
 Oakland, NE
 Rockford, IL
 Scandia, MN
 St. Peter, MN
 Stockholm, ME
 Stockholm, WI
 Westmanland, ME
 Wilcox, PA

Cities built with Swedish labor
 Astoria, OR
 Scotia, CA – Humboldt County

Swedish American holidays
Several holidays celebrated in Sweden have been brought to the United States by Swedish Americans.

Swedish Americans can celebrate with various Swedish Heritage societies across the country who try to keep the Swedish traditions alive.

Swedish Easter is celebrated around the first week of April, when Easter is celebrated in the United States. Traditionally, Swedes celebrate by dressing up children as little  (Easter witches) and their then going door to door asking for candy, similarly to Hallowe'en in the U.S. More recently  Swedes celebrate a typical American Easter with egg hunts and candy for the little ones to find. Swedish Americans often include  (an Easter bush) with twigs cut from a tree, placed in a vase with colored feathers and decorative hanging eggs added. Swedish tradition also found in Swedish American homes has a traditional , a large meal that is eaten together by families with foods such as deviled eggs, mashed potatoes, meatballs, pickled herring and other fresh fish like salmon.

Midsummer is celebrated at the summer solstice, recognizing the longest day of the year. Many Swedes dress in traditional folk costumes, often with girls and women wearing flowered head garlands, and gather together to eat, sing traditional songs with bands playing, and dance around a maypole. Festivities begin with decorating the horizontal maypole as people gather to affix greenery first, then after thus covering most of the pole, they add various types of flowers until the whole pole is covered. The men then lift it upright while the women follow in a line behind singing as they walk around with the maypole. At the end of the song, the men place the maypole in a hole in the ground raising it to its final position.

Swedish American of the Year
Annually a Swedish American of the Year is awarded through Vasa Order of America District Lodges 19 and 20 in Sweden.

Swedish-American business owners
 Nordstrom stores – John W. Nordstrom
 South Coast Plaza, South Coast Performing Arts Center, Segerstrom Concert Hall, Segerstrom High School – Henry Segerstrom
 O.F. Mossberg & Sons firearms; uses Swedish iconography in their logos.
Ragnar Benson Inc., founded by Ragnar Benson, was at the time one of the 10 largest general contracting firms in the United States. The company became one of Chicago's top builders, and erected many Fortune 500 landmark buildings.

Churches
Formal church membership in 1936 was reported as:
 Augustana Synod (Lutheran) – 1,203 churches – 254,677 members
 Mission Covenant – 441 churches – 45,000 members
 Swedish Baptist – 300 churches – 36,820 members
 Swedish Evangelical Free – 150 churches – 9,000 members
 Swedish Methodist – 175 churches – 19,441 members

The affiliated membership of a church is much larger than the formal membership.

Other churches
 Swedish Seaman's Church – located in many states
 Church of Sweden, Los Angeles – 
 Swedenborgian Church
 Danish Church

Until 2000, the Church of Sweden was the official state church of Sweden.

Nobel Conference
The Nobel Conference is an academic conference held annually at Gustavus Adolphus College in St. Peter, Minnesota. Founded in 1963, the conference links a general audience with the world's foremost scholars and researchers in conversations centered on contemporary issues related to the natural and social sciences. It is the first ongoing academic conference in the United States to have the official authorization of the Nobel Foundation in Stockholm, Sweden.

Demographics

A few small towns in the U.S. have retained a few visible Swedish characteristics. Some examples include Silverhill, Alabama; Cambridge, Minnesota; Lindstrom, Minnesota; Karlstad, Minnesota; Scandia, Minnesota; Lindsborg, Kansas; Gothenburg, Nebraska; Oakland, Nebraska; Andover, Illinois; Kingsburg, California; Bishop Hill, Illinois; Jamestown, New York; Mount Jewett, PA, Wilcox, PA, and Westby, Wisconsin, as well as significant areas of central Texas, including New Sweden and Georgetown, and areas in northern Maine: New Sweden, Stockholm, Jemptland, and Westmanland.

Around 3.9% of the U.S. population is said to have Fennoscandinavian ancestry (which also includes Norwegian Americans, Danish Americans, Finnish Americans, and Icelandic Americans). According to the 2005 American Community Survey, only 56,324 Americans continue to speak the Swedish language at home, down from 67,655 in 2000, most of whom are recent immigrants. Swedish American communities typically switched to English by 1920. Swedish is rarely taught in high schools or colleges, and Swedish-language newspapers or magazines are rare.

Swedish Americans by state
In 2020, Minnesota had the most Swedes, both by number (410,091) and by the percent of the state's population they make up (7.3%).

Notable people

See also

 Nordic and Scandinavian Americans
 Languages of the United States#Swedish
 Swedes in America, a documentary film
 Allt för Sverige, reality show about Swedish Americans
 Sweden – United States relations
 Augustana Evangelical Lutheran Church
Sweden-bashing
 Swedish Canadians
 Swedish American of the Year – annual award program 
 The American-Scandinavian Foundation
 Swede Hollow, neighborhood of St Paul Minnesota
 Swedes in Chicago
 Swedes in Omaha, Nebraska
 Nordstjernan – Swedish-American Newspaper
 American Swedish Historical Museum
 List of Swedish Americans
 American Swedish Institute

References

Further reading

 Akenson, Donald Harman. Ireland, Sweden, and the Great European Migration, 1815–1914  (McGill-Queen's University Press; 2011) 304 pages; compares the Irish and Swedish emigration
 Anderson, Philip J. and Dag Blanck, eds. Swedish-American Life in Chicago: Cultural and Urban Aspects of an Immigrant People, 1850–1930 (1992)
 Anderson Philip J. and Blanck Dag, editors. Swedes in the Twin Cities: Immigrant Life and Minnesota's Urban Frontier (2001).
 Anderson, Philip J., "From Compulsion to Persuasion: Voluntary Religion and the Swedish Immigrant Experience," Swedish-American Historical Quarterly, 66#1 (2015), 3–23.  
 Attebery, Jennifer Eastman. Pole Raising and Speech Making: Modalities of Swedish American Summer Celebration (University Press of Colorado, 2015).
 Baigent, Elizabeth. "Swedish Immigrants in Mckeesport, Pennsylvania: Did the Great American Dream Come True?" Journal of Historical Geography 2000 26(2): 239–272. )
 Barton, H. Arnold.  A Folk Divided: Homeland Swedes and Swedish-Americans, 1840–1940. (1994) 
 Barton, H. Arnold. "From Swede to Swedish American, or Vice Versa: The Conversion Motif in the Literature of Swedish America," Scandinavian Studies 70:1 (1998): 26–38. 
 Barton, H. Arnold. The Old Country and the New: Essays on Swedes and America (2007) 
 Benson, Adolph B. and Naboth Hedin, eds. Swedes in America, 1638–1938 (Yale University Press. 1938) 
 Biltekin, Nevra. "Migrating women and transnational relations: Swedish-American connections since the 1920s." Scandinavian Journal of History (2021): 1–19. online
 Björk, Ulf Jonas. "The Swedish-American Press as an Immigrant Institution," Swedish-American Historical Quarterly 2000 51(4): 268–282
 Blanck, Dag.  Becoming Swedish-American: The Construction of an Ethnic Identity in the Augustana Synod, 1860–1917. (Uppsala, 1997)
 Blanck, Dag. The Creation of an Ethnic Identity: Being Swedish American in the Augustana Synod, 1860–1917, (2007) 256 pp )
 Blanck, Dag, and Adam Hjorthén, eds. Swedish-American Borderlands: New Histories of Transatlantic Relations (U of Minnesota Press, 2021).
 Blanck, Dag. "'Very Welcome Home Mr. Swanson': Swedish Americans Encounter Homeland Swedes." American Studies in Scandinavia 48.2 (2016): 107–121. online On the 250,000 who went to USA but returned to Sweden.
 Brøndal, Jørn. Ethnic Leadership and Midwestern Politics: Scandinavian Americans and the Progressive Movement in Wisconsin, 1890–1914 (University of Illinois Press, 2004).
 Brøndal, Jørn. "'The Fairest among the So-Called White Races': Portrayals of Scandinavian Americans in the Filiopietistic and Nativist Literature of the Late Nineteenth and Early Twentieth Centuries." Journal of American Ethnic History 33.3 (2014): 5–36. in JSTOR
 Dribe, Martin; Eriksson, Björn; Helgertz, Jonas (2022). "From Sweden to America: migrant selection in the transatlantic migration, 1890–1910". European Review of Economic History.
 Erling, Maria Elizabeth. "Crafting an urban piety: New England's Swedish immigrants and their religious culture from 1880 to 1915" (PhD dissertation,  Harvard Divinity School; ProQuest Dissertations Publishing, 1996. 9631172).
 Granquist, Mark A. "Swedish Americans." in Gale Encyclopedia of Multicultural America, edited by Thomas Riggs, (3rd ed., vol. 4, Gale, 2014), pp. 305–318. Online
 Gustafson, Anita Olson. "'We hope to be able to do some good': Swedish-American women's organizations in Chicago." Swedish-American Historical Quarterly (2008) 59#4 pp 178–201; covers 1840 to 1950.
 Gustafson, Anita Olson. Swedish Chicago: The Shaping of an Immigrant Community, 1880–1920 (Northern Illinois University Press, 2018).
 Hale, Frederick.  Swedes in Wisconsin. Wisconsin State Historical Society (2nd ed 2013). excerpt
 Hasselmo, Nils. Perspectives on Swedish Immigration (1978).
 Hillary, Michael Lee. Religion, immigrant churches, and community in an industrializing city: Swedish Protestants in Rockford, Illinois, 1854–1925 (PhD dissertation, Columbia University; ProQuest Dissertations Publishing, 2005. 3151265).
 Janson, Florence Edith. The background of Swedish immigration, 1840–1930 (1931; reprinted 1970), Push factors in Sweden. online
 Johnson, Amandus. The Swedish Settlements on the Delaware, 1638–1664 (2 vol. 1911–1927) "%29&sort=-date online
 Kastrup, Allan. Swedish heritage in America (1975) online
 Lindell, Terrence Jon. "Acculturation among Swedish immigrants in Kansas and Nebraska, 1870-1900" (PhD dissertation, University of Nebraska-Lincoln; ProQuest Dissertations Publishing, 1987. 8810322).
 Lindquist, Emory. "The Swedish Immigrant and Life in Kansas," Kansas Historical Quarterly (1963) 29#1 pp: 1–24 online
 Lintelman, Joy Kathleen. " 'More freedom, better pay': Single Swedish immigrant women in the United States, 1880-1920" (PhD dissertation, University of Minnesota; ProQuest Dissertations Publishing, 1991. 9212069).
 Ljungmark, Lars. Swedish Exodus. (1996).
 Ljungmark, Lars. For Sale: Minnesota. Organized Promotion of Scandinavian Immigration, 1866–1873 (1971).
 Lundström, Catrin. "Embodying exoticism: gendered nuances of Swedish hyper-whiteness in the United States." Scandinavian Studies 89.2 (2017): 179–199. online
 McKnight, Roger. "Those Swedish Madmen Again: The Image of the Swede in Swedish-American Literature." Scandinavian Studies 56.2 (1984): 114–139. online
 Magocsi, Paul Robert. Encyclopedia of Canada's Peoples (1999), pp 1218–33
 Mead, Rebecca J. Swedes in Michigan (Michigan State U Press, 2012) online review
 Nelson, O. N. History of the Scandinavians and Successful Scandinavians in the United States (2 vol 1904); 886pp online full text  also online review
 Nelson, Helge. The Swedes and the Swedish Settlements in North America 2 vols. (Lund, 1943)
 Nelson, Robert J.  If We Could Only Come to America... A Story of Swedish Immigrants in the Midwest. (Sunflower U. Press, 2004)
 Norman, Hans, and Harald Runblom. Transatlantic Connections: Nordic Migration to the New World After 1800 (1988).
 Olson, Anita Ruth. "Swedish Chicago: The extension and transformation of an urban immigrant community, 1880-1920" (PhD dissertation, Northwestern University; ProQuest Dissertations Publishing, 1990. 9031971).
 Ostergren, R. C. 1988. A Community Transplanted: The Trans-Atlantic Experience of a Swedish Immigrant Settlement in the Upper Middle West, 1835–1915. (University of Wisconsin Press).
 Pihlblad, C. T. "The Kansas Swedes," Southwestern Social Science Quarterly 1932. 13#1 pp 34–47).
 Rooth, Dan-Olof, and Kirk Scott. "Three generations in the New World: labour market outcomes of Swedish Americans in the USA, 1880–2000." Scandinavian Economic History Review 60.1 (2012): 31–49; on occupations
 Runblom, Harald and Hans Norman. From Sweden to America: A History of the Migration (Uppsala and Minneapolis, 1976)
 Schersten, Albert Ferdinand. "The Relation of the Swedish-American Newspaper to the Assimilation of Swedish Immigrants" (PhD dissertation, University of Iowa; ProQuest Dissertations Publishing, 1932. 10764279).
 Stephenson, George M. The Religious Aspects of Swedish Immigration (1932).
 Swanson, Alan. Literature and the Immigrant Community: The Case of Arthur Landfors (Southern Illinois University Press, 1990)
 Thernstrom, Stephan, ed. Harvard Encyclopedia of American Ethnic Groups (1980) 
 Tsuchida, Eiko. "Science, technology, and Swedish-American identity: An immigrant acculturation in Chicago, 1890-1935" (PhD dissertation, University of Chicago; ProQuest Dissertations Publishing, 2014. 3615684).
 Wheeler, Wayne Leland. "An Analysis of Social Change in a Swedish-Immigrant Community: The Case of Lindsborg, Kansas." (PhD dissertation, University of Missouri-Columbia; ProQuest Dissertations Publishing, 1959. 5905657).
 Whyman, Henry C.  The Hedstroms and the Bethel Ship Saga: Methodist Influence on Swedish Religious Life. (1992). 183 pp.  
 Wittke, Carl. We Who Built America: The Saga of the Immigrant (1939), 552pp good older history pp 260–77 online

Historiography
 Attebery, Jennifer Eastman. Up in the Rocky Mountains: Writing the Swedish Immigrant Experience (2007), studies letters written back to Sweden excerpt
 Barton, H. Arnold. "Emigrants Versus Immigrants: Contrasting Views" Swedish-American Historical Quarterly (2001) 52#1 pp 3–13
 Barton, H. Arnold. "Cultural interplay between Sweden and Swedish America" Swedish-American Historical Quarterly (1992) 43#1 pp 5–18.
 Beijbom, Ulf. "The Historiography of Swedish America"  Swedish-American Historical Quarterly 31 (1980): 257–85)
 Beijbom, Ulf, ed.  Swedes in America: Intercultural and Interethnic Perspectives on Contemporary Research.   Växjö, Sweden: Emigrant-Inst. Väers Förlag, 1993. 224 pp.
 Blanck, Dag. "The Transnational Viking: The Role of the Viking in Sweden, the United States, and Swedish America." Journal of Transnational American Studies 7.1 (2016). online
 Kvisto, P., and D. Blanck, eds.  American Immigrants and Their Generations: Studies and Commentaries on the Hansen Thesis after Fifty Years. (University of Illinois Press, 1990)
 Lovoll, Odd S. ed., Nordics in America: The Future of Their Past (Northfield, Minn., Norwegian American Historic Association. 1993)
 Schnell, Steven M. "Creating Narratives of Place and Identity in 'Little Sweden, U.S.A.'" The Geographical Review, (2003) Vol. 93,
 Vecoli, Rudolph J. "'Over the Years I Have Encountered the Hazards and Rewards that Await the Historian of Immigration,' George M. Stephenson and the Swedish American Community," Swedish American Historical Quarterly 51 (April 2000): 130–49.

Primary sources
 Barton, H. Arnold, ed. Letters from the Promised Land: Swedes in America, 1840–1914. (Minneapolis: University of Minnesota Press for the Swedish Pioneer Historical Society, 1975.)
  Lintelman, Joy K. ed. I Go to America: Swedish American Women and the Life of Mina Anderson (2009)
 Varg, Paul A. ed "Report of Count Carl Lewenhaupt on Swedish-Norwegian Immigration in 1870"  Swedish Pioneer Historical Quarterly. 1979, 30#1 pp 5–24.  Swedish diplomat provides a wealth of factual detail on immigrants. online free copy

External links

Media, publications, education
 Swedes in America, video, 17:17, c. 1942, narrated by Ingrid Bergman
 Concordia Language Villages – Swedish Language Camp
 Nordstjernan – Swedish Newspaper in America
 Svenska kyrkan Church of Sweden
 Swedenborgian Church
 Swedish American of the Year

Organizations and associations
 Embassy of Sweden, Washington D.C.
 House of Sweden
 International Expats Club
 ISwede – New York and Los Angeles
 Multi-cultural America Swedish Americans
 New Sweden Cultural Heritage Society
 Swedish American Central Association of Southern California (SACA)
 SACC New York – Swedish-American Chamber of Commerce New York
 Swedish American Heritage Society of West Michigan
 Swedish-American Historic Society
 Swedish Colonial Society
 Swedish Council of America (SCA)
 Swedish Historic Society of Rockford, IL
 Swedish Women's Educational Association (SWEA)
 Vasa Order Of America (VOA)

Museums and research centers
 American Swedish Historical Museum
 American Swedish Institute (ASI)
 Heritage Park of North Iowa in Forest City, IA
 Swedish American Museum Center in Chicago, IL
 Swedish American Museum in Swedesburg, Iowa
 Swenson Swedish Immigration Research Center – Augustana College, IL

Festivals, music, points of interest
 Bishop Hill, IL; Dedicated to preserving the life of the pioneer Swedish immigrants in America, following spiritual leader, Erik Jansson
 Svensk Hyllningsfest in Lindsborg, Kansas
 Wayfarers Chapel, Rancho Palos Verdes, CA 90275

Scandinavian centers and organizations
 Scandinavian American Cultural and Historic Foundation – Thousand Oaks, CA
 Scandinavian Cultural Center – Santa Cruz, CA
 American Scandinavian Foundation – Santa Barbara, CA

Social media
 VASA Global.com – Intl. Chamber of Commerce Support
 Scandinavian Foodie; Recipes, Restaurants – post yours & share stories
 Vasa Order of America (friends of) Swedish-American
 Swedish Expats Club

 
American
European-American society